Fabian Whymns (born 11 June 1961) is a Bahamian sprinter. He competed in the men's 100 metres at the 1988 Summer Olympics.

References

1961 births
Living people
Athletes (track and field) at the 1988 Summer Olympics
Bahamian male sprinters
Olympic athletes of the Bahamas
Place of birth missing (living people)